The World Unity Football Alliance (WUFA) is an international governing body for association football teams that are not affiliated with FIFA, similar to but smaller than the older Confederation of Independent Football Associations. WUFA was founded in 2020 to oversee international competition among the non-FIFA affiliated associations in the world, the alliance of football associations does not have a centralised management structure.

History
WUFA initially announced 9 founding members, and were joined by the Yorkshire International Football Association on 8 July. Of the 18 members of WUFA, 11 are also members of CONIFA, Darfur left CONIFA prior to establishing WUFA, and Surrey were not a member of any federation prior to joining WUFA. On 13 July 2020, WUFA announced a partnership with CSANF – Consejo Sudamericano de Nuevas Federaciones, establishing an alliance. 3 members, the Armenian Argentine Community, Rapa Nui (Easter Island) and Mapuche Nation later joined as members of the World Unity Football Alliance as well as the CSANF.

On 12 September 2020, WUFA announced their first tournament, the World Series, scheduled for 2021. On 6 April 2021, International Surrey Football announced it would host the first stage of the WUFA World Series, all 4 games were played behind closed doors due in part to local COVID restrictions imposed in the United Kingdom at the time.  On 7 July 2021, WUFA announced the Kashmir Football Association as its newest member. Kashmir was not previously a member of any non-FIFA organisation prior to joining WUFA. On 29 June 2021, WUFA announced plans to organise the WUFA Women's World Unity Cup, its first major international tournament. On 15 March 2022, the World Unity Football Alliance announced the election of its first General Secretary, President and founder of members International Surrey Football.

Members

Member Federation
 Consejo Sudamericano de Nuevas Federaciones de Fútbol (COSANFF)

Tournaments

Men's World Unity Cup
WUFA Men's World Unity Cup

Women's World Unity Cup
WUFA Women's World Unity Cup

World Series
 2021 WUFA World Series

Organisation

General Secretary

See also
Non-FIFA international football
New Football Federations-Board
CONIFA  – Several WUFA members also hold membership of the CONIFA.

References

External links
 

Association football governing bodies
Sports organizations established in 2020